

Events
April 13 – Gambino crime family soldier Bartholomew "Bobby" Boriello was gunned down outside his Bensonhurst, Brooklyn home.
August 9 – Antonio Scopelliti, the prosecutor scheduled to argue the government’s case in the final appeal of the Maxi Trial before the Italian Supreme Court, is assassinated while on vacation in Calabria.
August 29 – Libero Grassi, a Palermo businessman who publicly defied the Mafia’s extortion racket is murdered in Palermo.

Arts and literature
Billy Bathgate (film)  starring Dustin Hoffman, Loren Dean, Bruce Willis, Steven Hill, Steve Buscemi and Stanley Tucci.
Boyz n the Hood (film)  starring Laurence Fishburne, Cuba Gooding Jr. and Ice Cube.
Mobsters (film)  starring Christian Slater, Patrick Dempsey, Richard Grieco, Costas Mandylor, F. Murray Abraham, Chris Penn and Anthony Quinn.
Oscar (film)  starring Peter Riegert, Chazz Palminteri, Joey Travolta and Sylvester Stallone
New Jack City (film)

Births

Deaths
June 24 – Philip Rastelli "Rusty", Bonanno crime family boss

Organized crime
Years in organized crime